Howard Township is one of thirteen townships in Washington County, Indiana, United States. As of the 2010 census, its population was 1,262 and it contained 494 housing units. It was named for Gen. Tilghman Howard.

Geography

Unincorporated towns
 Becks Mill at 
 Organ Springs at 
 Rosebud at 
(This list is based on USGS data and may include former settlements.)

Adjacent townships
 Washington Township (northeast)
 Pierce Township (east)
 Jackson Township (southeast)
 Posey Township (southwest)
 Madison Township (west)
 Vernon Township (northwest)

Cemeteries
The township contains these five cemeteries: Becks, Hall, Kansas Church, Smith-Miller Pioneer and Voyles.

School districts
 West Washington School Corporation

Political districts
 Indiana's 9th congressional district
 State House District 73
 State Senate District 44

References
 United States Census Bureau 2007 TIGER/Line Shapefiles
 United States Board on Geographic Names (GNIS)
 IndianaMap

External links
 Indiana Township Association
 United Township Association of Indiana

Townships in Washington County, Indiana
Townships in Indiana